Oak Harbor High School may refer to:
Oak Harbor High School (Washington) in Oak Harbor, Washington
Oak Harbor High School (Ohio) in Oak Harbor, Ohio